Matthias Müller (born 18 October 1954) is a retired German footballer. Müller began his career with his hometown club, Dynamo Dresden, where he established himself in the first-team, playing at full-back as the team won three East German titles and one cup. Müller represented East Germany at most levels of youth football, and won four caps for the senior team in 1980. He was also part of the squad that won the silver medal at the 1980 Summer Olympics.

In January 1981, prior to a national team tour of South America, Müller and Dresden teammates Peter Kotte and Gerd Weber were arrested at Berlin-Schönefeld Airport by the Stasi for plotting to escape to the west. Weber was given a prison sentence, but Kotte and Müller were released, but banned from playing at the top level of East German football.

Müller played out the rest of the 1980s with a succession of lower league clubs. After reunification he had a brief stint with Tennis Borussia Berlin, before retiring. He now works as a coach.

References

External links
 
 
 

1954 births
Living people
Footballers from Dresden
German footballers
East German footballers
East Germany international footballers
Olympic footballers of East Germany
Olympic silver medalists for East Germany
Footballers at the 1980 Summer Olympics
Association football fullbacks
Dynamo Dresden players
Tennis Borussia Berlin players
Olympic medalists in football
DDR-Oberliga players
Medalists at the 1980 Summer Olympics